The 1986 Tour de France was the 73rd edition of Tour de France, one of cycling's Grand Tours. The Tour began in Boulogne-Billancourt with a prologue individual time trial on 4 July and Stage 12 occurred on 15 July with a mountainous stage from Bayonne. The race finished on the Champs-Élysées in Paris on 27 July.

Stage 12
15 July 1986 — Bayonne to Pau, 

This mountainous stage departed from Bayonne heading south through Villefranque and then south-east to Hasparren. With the race turning south to the Category 4 Côte de Mendionde and then south-east to the Category 4 Côte d'Hélette, the riders gently descended south through Irissarry and west to Ossès. The race then headed south to Saint-Jean-Pied-de-Port and turned east to Saint-Jean-le-Vieux. After fully descending north-east through Licq and north to Tardets, the race headed east over the Category 4 Côte du Monument Lopez, continuing through Lanne-en-Barétous to Aramits. The race then turned north to Sévignacq-Meyracq, continuing through Rebenacq and Gan, over the Category 4 climb of the Côte de Larroude to the finish line in Pau.

Stage 13
16 July 1986 — Pau to Superbagnères, 

This mountainous stage departed from Pau and headed south-east through Aressy, Assat, Boeil-Bezing, Igon and Lestelle-Bétharram to Saint-Pé-de-Bigorre. The route then turned east through Peyrouse to Lourdes.

Stage 14
17 July 1986 — Luchon to Blagnac, 

This descending hilly stage departed from Luchon gently descending north through Cazaux-Layrisse and Cierp-Gaud to Martres-de-Rivière. The riders continued east to Saint-Gaudens and turned north over the Category 4 Côte de la Serre through Saint-Marcet and then over the Category 4 Côte de Saint-Patatin to Montgaillard. The riders then turned north-east to Anan and continued through L'Isle-en-Dodon to Lombez. The race then headed east, travelling through Bragayrac to Sainte-Foy-de-Peyrolières. Turning north-east again, the race continued through Saint-Lys and Fonsorbes to Plaisance-du-Touch. The route then turned north, travelling through Pibrac to Cornebarrieu. Finally, heading south-east around Toulouse–Blagnac Airport to the finish line at Blagnac.

Stage 15
18 July 1986 — Carcassonne to Nîmes,

Stage 16
19 July 1986 — Nîmes to Gap,

Stage 17
20 July 1986 — Gap to Serre Chevalier, 

This mountainous stage departed from Gap heading east through La Bâtie-Neuve and Chorges, across the Lac de Serre-Ponçon to Savines-le-Lac. The riders then turned south-west over the Category 3 Côte des Demoiselles to Le Sauze and then south-east to Le Lauzet-Ubaye.
The race continued east through Les Thuiles and Barcelonnette to Jausiers.

Stage 18
21 July 1986 — Briançon to Alpe d'Huez, 

22 July 1986 — Rest day

Stage 19
23 July 1986 — Villard-de-Lans to Saint-Étienne,

Stage 20
24 July 1986 — Saint-Étienne to Saint-Étienne,  (individual time trial)

Stage 21
25 July 1986 — Saint-Étienne to Puy de Dôme,

Stage 22
26 July 1986 — Clermont-Ferrand to Nevers,

Stage 23
27 July 1986 — Cosne-sur-Loire to Paris,

References

1986 Tour de France
Tour de France stages